Verrucadithella is a genus of pseudoscorpions in the family Tridenchthoniidae. There are at least three described species in Verrucadithella.

Species
These three species belong to the genus Verrucadithella:
 Verrucadithella dilatimana (Redikorzev, 1924)
 Verrucadithella jeanneli Beier, 1935
 Verrucadithella sulcatimana Beier, 1944

References

Further reading

External links

 

Tridenchthoniidae
Pseudoscorpion genera